The following is a list of notable works of fiction which are set in South Africa:

Age of Iron by J.M. Coetzee
Karoo Boy by Troy Blacklaws
Burger's Daughter by Nadine Gordimer
The Conservationist by Nadine Gordimer
Ah, But Your Land Is Beautiful by Alan Paton
Cry, The Beloved Country by Alan Paton
Too Late the Phalarope by Alan Paton
Disgrace by J.M. Coetzee
Embrace by Mark Behr
Fiela's Child by Dalene Matthee
Flowers in the Sand by Clive Algar
Get a Life by Nadine Gordimer
In the Heart of the Country  by J.M. Coetzee
July's People by Nadine Gordimer
Journeys to the End of the World by Clive Algar
Life & Times of Michael K by J.M. Coetzee
The Pickup  by Nadine Gordimer
A Song in the Morning by Gerald Seymour
No Turning Back by Beverley Naidoo
 Tween Snow and Fire;: A Tale of South Africa by Bertram Mitford (novelist)
The Gun-Runner: A Tale of Zululand by Bertram Mitford
The Power of One by Bryce Courtenay
Tandia by Bryce Courtenay
Time of the Butcherbird by Alex la Guma
Whitethorn by Bryce Courtenay
When the Lion Feeds by Wilbur Smith
The Sound of Thunder by Wilbur Smith
A Sparrow Falls by Wilbur Smith
The Burning Shore by Wilbur Smith
Power of the Sword by Wilbur Smith
Nada the Lily by H. Rider Haggard
King Solomon's Mines by H. Rider Haggard
Jess by H. Rider Haggard
Swallow by H. Rider Haggard
The Diamond Hunters by Wilbur Smith
Great Elephant by Alan Scholefield
The Stone Flower by Alan Scholefield
Wild Dog Running by Alan Scholefield
A View of Vultures by Alan Scholefield
Dash from Diamond City by George Manville Fenn
The Covenant by James A. Michener
The Servants' Quarters by Lynn Freed
House of Women by Lynn Freed
Vortex by Larry Bond
No Time Like the Present by Nadine Gordimer

South African culture
Fiction set in